Alberto Medina Briseño (born 29 May 1983) is a Mexican former professional footballer who played as a winger. He is known as El Venado (The Deer) due to his speed.

Club career
Medina made his professional debut for Chivas on 8 August 2000 at 17 years, and won an award for most promising player. Alberto "El Venado" Medina (at time of reporting) had seven goals in the Apertura 2006, alongside his partners Adolfo Bautista and Omar Bravo, and he was a major factor in Chivas' Championship win for the Apertura 2006 Tournament. Medina had the game – winning assist in the championship game of the Apertura 2006 Tournament.

Beto (Medina) had a tremendous start to the Clausura 2007 Tournament, he scored six goals in eighteen games in the league. One of his more amazing goals came in the Super Clasico game against rivals America. A lob pass came from Diego Martínez which Medina controlled in the box and with a perfect technique, cut and finished excellently with a powerful shot over America's goalie Guillermo Ochoa. Chivas went on to win 2–0 at home. Medina is part of attacking duo in the pitch alongside his teammate Omar Bravo, often switching sides on either wing to confuse the rival team. Alberto has shown that he is an important part of Chivas with his blistering speed, ball control and accurate crosses.

On June 2, 2012, Chivas sold Medina to Pachuca due to the poor last two seasons he had. Medina played for Chivas from 2000 to 2012 where he registered 323 caps on the Mexican League with 52 goals, and 39 assists.

Later that year, on November 28, Pachuca confirmed that Medina was sold to Puebla F.C. for the next season.

International career
Ricardo Lavolpe called Medina to Mexico's national team many times, be it for friendly matches in 2003, the Athens Olympic Games in 2004, or for the 2005 Confederations Cup in Germany as a substitute for senior players such as Jared Borgetti or fellow Chivas player Ramón Morales.

He was called upon once again to represent the Selección de fútbol de México (Mexico national team) during Hugo Sánchez's tenure as coach. He represented his country in the 2007 Gold Cup tournament where they were finalist. He also played in Venezuela in the Copa América 2007 where his country won 3rd place and only losing to Argentina in the semi-finals.

Alberto was recalled to the national team under coach Javier Aguirre's second stint. Medina made Aguirre's squad for the 2010 FIFA World Cup, scoring in all the friendlies before the start of the tournament, but did not appear in any matches.

Career statistics

International

International goals
Scores and results list Mexico's goal tally first.

Honours
Guadalajara
Mexican Primera División: Apertura 2006
 InterLiga 2009

Mexico
CONCACAF Gold Cup: 2009

References

External links
 
 
 
 Chivas de Guadalajara official site 
 Alberto Medina at FootballDatabase.com

1983 births
Living people
Sportspeople from Culiacán
Footballers from Sinaloa
C.D. Guadalajara footballers
C.F. Pachuca players
Liga MX players
Mexico international footballers
CONCACAF Gold Cup-winning players
2005 CONCACAF Gold Cup players
2005 FIFA Confederations Cup players
2007 CONCACAF Gold Cup players
2007 Copa América players
2009 CONCACAF Gold Cup players
2010 FIFA World Cup players
Club Puebla players
Association football midfielders
Mexican footballers
Footballers at the 2003 Pan American Games
Pan American Games bronze medalists for Mexico
Medalists at the 2003 Pan American Games
Pan American Games medalists in football